Slovo i Chas (translated to Word and Time) is a literary studies journal founded in 1957 and published in Kyiv, Ukraine.

Between 1957 and 1990, it was called Soviet Literary Studies (Radyanske Literaturoznavstvo), before changing its name to Word and Time. The journal started out as a bimonthly periodical; from their January 1965 issue until 2020, they published issues monthly, before again returning to a bimonthly publishing schedule.

The journal focuses on topics within literature, including Ukrainian literature, literary history and theory, and contemporary literature.

Editors-in-chief 

 1957–1961 - 
 1961–1972 - 
 1973–1979 - 
 1980–1989 - Igor Dzeverin
 July 1989–January 2000 - 
 February 2000–2019 - 
 2020–present - Igor Nabitovich

References 

Literary magazines published in Ukraine
Publications established in 1957
Academic journals published in Ukraine
Bimonthly journals
Monthly journals
Academic journals published by universities and colleges